Tatum Keshwar (born 14 December 1983) is a South African fashion model, psychologist and beauty pageant titleholder who was crowned Miss South Africa 2008. She represented South Africa at Miss Universe 2009 and placed in the top 10. Keshwar also represented South Africa at Miss World 2009 and placed second runner-up.

Biography
Born in Durban, Keshwar attended Mowat Park Girls High and received a degree in psychology from the University of KwaZulu-Natal. She was a finalist in the third period of the reality modeling contest Revlon Supermodel in 2007 prior to winning Miss South Africa on 15 December 2008.

Miss Universe 2009
Keshwar represented her country in Miss Universe 2009 in Nassau, Bahamas where she made the finals and placed seventh overall.

Miss World 2009
Keshwar placed among the top 12 at the Miss World Top Model fast-track event and became one of the Top 3 finalists during Miss World 2009 held on 12 December 2009 in Johannesburg, South Africa. Out of the seven delegates who competed at both Miss Universe and Miss World, Keshwar and Chloé Mortaud of France were the only two who placed in the semifinals in both competitions. Keshwar, who ranked one position lower than Mortaud at the Miss Universe pageant earlier that year, finished higher than her French counterpart, being named Queen of Africa and crowned second princess at the finale.

External links
 TVSA Actor Profile
 Snaparazzi Gallery

      

1983 births
Living people
People from Durban
South African female models
South African people of Indian descent
Miss Universe 2009 contestants
Miss World 2009 delegates
Miss South Africa winners